Helen Casey (born 6 February 1974 in Stockport) is a British rower. She rowed in the Women's Lightweight Double Sculls at the 2004 and 2008 Summer Olympics and studied at Worcester College, Oxford.

References

External links
 
 

1974 births
Living people
English female rowers
British female rowers
Sportspeople from Stockport
Rowers at the 2004 Summer Olympics
Rowers at the 2008 Summer Olympics
Alumni of Worcester College, Oxford
Olympic rowers of Great Britain

World Rowing Championships medalists for Great Britain